"", also known as "", is the regional anthem of the Northern Mariana Islands, an unincorporated territory and commonwealth of the United States.

History
The Chamorro lyrics for the official territorial anthem of the Commonwealth of the Northern Mariana Islands (CNMI) were jointly written by brothers Jose and Joaquin Pangelinan, presumably around the time after the Second World War had ended. The Carolinian lyrics for the CNMI's territorial anthem were written by David Kapileo Peter "Taulamwaar" the day before the signing of the Covenant in 1976. David Marciano assisted with parts of the Carolinian version of the lyrics, and his contributions were incorporated before being sang for the first time on the day that the Covenant with the United States of America was signed. Vicente "Kilili" Sablan Sr., former Mayor of the Northern Mariana Islands capital, Saipan, assisted by translating the lyrics into English and Japanese. The Rematau band was the first group to sing and record the "Commonwealth National Anthem". 

During the First Constitutional Convention, a resolution was introduced to compel the new government to proclaim the song as the official territorial anthem of the soon-to-be-created Commonwealth of the Northern Mariana Islands. In 1996, it became the official territorial anthem by virtue of Public Law 10-28, authored in the Tenth CNMI Legislature and signed by then Governor Froilan Cruz Tenorio into law. Both versions of the territorial anthem are taught to students as well as displayed prominently in official programs and posters, as both versions make up the one territorial anthem – not one or the other. The melody of the song is taken from the 19th-century German tune "Im schönsten Wiesengrunde" (with lyrics written by Wilhelm Ganzhorn in 1851), which in turn is based on the older folk tune "Drei Lilien, drei Lilien". Coincidentally, the national anthem of the neighboring Federated States of Micronesia is derived from a 19th-century German song.

Since the islands are a U.S. dependency, the national anthem is still the U.S. one, "The Star-Spangled Banner", and the anthem is played after "The Star-Spangled Banner" in the raising of the territorial flag.

Lyrics

Notes

References

National symbols of the Northern Mariana Islands
Oceanian anthems
Anthems of insular areas of the United States